Sonic Unleashed is a 2008 platform video game in the Sonic the Hedgehog series. The story follows Sonic as he attempts to restore the world after his nemesis Doctor Eggman shatters it with a powerful laser to unleash Dark Gaia, an ancient evil, while dealing with having become a "Werehog", a werewolf-like transformation, which he gains after coming into contact with the energy of Dark Gaia. Gameplay features two distinct styles, with each being played either during daytime or nighttime. Daytime stages incorporate Sonic's traditional platforming and trademark speed, with a combination of behind-the-back third-person viewpoints and 2D side-scroller platforming; gameplay seamlessly transitions between these two views. Night-time levels see Sonic transform into the Werehog; gameplay slows down to accommodate greater platform play, and involves combat against waves of enemies using the Werehog's brute strength.

The game's development began in 2006 and lasted 18 months, after the creation of its game engine, the Hedgehog Engine. It was initially conceived as a sequel to Sonic Adventure 2 (2001), but developer Sonic Team began to introduce enough new innovations that separated it from previous games, and it was renamed Sonic World Adventure in domestic markets. The Werehog gameplay was conceived to help introduce newer gamers unfamiliar with the Sonic franchise to the series and is what influenced the use of Unleashed as a subtitle for western markets. The game's existence was first brought to light when Sega trademarked the Unleashed name in March 2008, and shortly after, images and a gameplay video were leaked. Three versions of the game were developed: one by Sonic Team for high definition consoles such as the Xbox 360 and PlayStation 3, one by Sonic Team and Dimps for standard definition consoles such as the Wii and PlayStation 2, and one by Gameloft for mobile phones. The game was released worldwide in 2008.

Public anticipation for Sonic Unleashed was high, as video game journalists saw it as a possible return to Sonic's platforming roots. While it was commercially successful, selling 2.45 million units, initial critical reception was mixed. Reviewers praised certain elements, such as the sense of speed in daylight stages and the graphics and audio that make up the environments, but criticized others, such as the Werehog game mechanic, as well as several gameplay and design concepts. Many felt Unleashed was not the game to reinvigorate the series. Sonic Unleashed was delisted from retailers in 2010, following Sega's decision to remove all Sonic games with below-average Metacritic scores from sale. Despite this, the PlayStation 3 version was relisted in April 2014 and added to PlayStation Now in March 2017, while the Xbox 360 version was relisted and made backward compatible for Xbox One in November 2018.

Gameplay

Sonic Unleashed is a platform game in which the player controls the titular Sonic the Hedgehog in two modes: fast-paced levels that take place during daytime, showcasing and using Sonic's trademark speed as seen in previous games in the series, and slower, night-time levels, during which Sonic transforms into the Werehog, and gameplay switches to an action-based, brawler style of play, in which Sonic battles Gaia enemies (those created by the main enemy in the game, Dark Gaia). Each level takes place on a particular continent, each of which is based on a real-world location. In sections of the Xbox 360 and PlayStation 3 versions of the game, the player may choose to advance the time of day in order to play as either Sonic or the Werehog; in the Wii and PlayStation 2 versions, time is advanced automatically.

Daytime levels focus on Sonic's speed, and to this extent, sees the player control Sonic through fast-moving stages containing both 2D and 3D styles of gameplay. 2D sections are reminiscent of the Mega Drive/Genesis-era Sonic games where the player controls Sonic in a side-scrolling fashion, while 3D sections see the camera placed behind Sonic so the player may move in all directions. In addition to moves available in past games, such as the Homing Attack, new moves are also introduced. For instance, a new sidestep feature known as the Quick Step is available, allowing Sonic to dodge left and right, and a Drift feature, which allows Sonic to make tighter turns without slowing down. The game also features a gameplay mechanic previously used in the Sonic Rush series called the Sonic Boost, which greatly increases Sonic's speed, allowing him to smash through objects, destroy enemies instantly, or even access different level paths. In the Xbox 360 and PlayStation 3 versions, an on-screen "Ring Energy" meter displays how much Boost is available. The amount of Boost remaining may be increased by collecting more rings, and is decreased by using the Boost. In contrast, the Wii and PlayStation 2 versions of the game represent available Boost using bars, which may be added by performing "Action Chains", destroying multiple enemies in quick succession through the use of homing attacks, or by collecting rings. Japanese game company Dimps helped design some of the stages.

Night-time levels are slow-paced and action-oriented, while also featuring simple puzzle elements. Gameplay focuses on Sonic's new "Werehog" form, which gives him great strength and stretchable arms. As the Werehog, the player can cling to distant objects, move items around and perform combo attacks to defeat enemies and advance through the level. Collecting rings replenishes the Werehog's health, while a special move, Unleashed Mode, allows him to channel his energy into increasing the power of his attacks for a short time. Night-time levels are adjusted in the Wii version to allow greater use of the Wii Remote, such that players may control the arms of the Werehog by using the Wii Remote and Nunchuk in order to grab onto objects and proceed in the levels. The Wii version also expands upon the ratio of night-time levels to daytime, with more than three times as many night-time levels (twenty-five in all). After night-time levels are completed, Dark Gaia Points are gained, allowing access to bonus moves.

In addition to these two gameplay types, Sonic Unleashed also features hub worlds, in which the player may reveal, as well as advance, the story of the game. Hubworlds operate differently depending on the version of the game being played; the PlayStation 3 and Xbox 360 versions feature fully interactive, explorable 3D hub worlds, similar to those in Sonic the Hedgehog and Sonic Adventure, in which townspeople may be interacted with and side quests may be undertaken, in order to gain experience or unlock items, such as artwork, videos and music tracks. In contrast, the Wii and PlayStation 2 versions feature menu-based map systems, in which players simply click on areas to talk to townspeople and find information. Within both day and night-time levels are medals that Sonic may collect, two types of which exist: Sun and Moon. In the Xbox 360 and PlayStation 3 versions, collecting these medals allows the player to level up Sonic's Sun and Moon stats, and these must be increased to reach new stages in the game, with a certain number of Sun Medals for Hedgehog levels, and a certain number of Moon Medals for Werehog levels. Because only the Xbox 360 and PlayStation 3 versions feature playable hubworlds, these are also the only versions in which Sun and Moon Medals may be found by exploring the towns, talking to the citizens, and completing side quests. In the Wii and PlayStation 2 versions, Sun and Moon Medals are earned after completing stages and clearing their objectives. The medals are used to open up doors in Gaia gates, which can earn bonus content.

Plot

In a cold open, Sonic is pursuing his nemesis, Doctor Eggman, bounding around a fleet of spaceships. After the defeat of several of his robots, Sonic transforms into Super Sonic and corners Eggman on the main spaceship. However, Eggman traps the hedgehog using the energy field of a powerful new ray weapon called the Chaos Energy Cannon, which robs him of his Super Sonic power and removes the Chaos Emeralds out of him as well as their power, causing them to turn grey and useless. He then uses the Emeralds' energy to fire an enormous laser and unleash a powerful beast, Dark Gaia, from the center of the planet, which has devastating consequences, shattering the planet into seven pieces. In addition, the process has the unforeseen side-effect of transforming Sonic into a "Werehog" — a beast form that loses speed but gains greater strength and abilities — at night. Eggman ejects Sonic into space, who then lands safely onto the planet below thanks to a strange green shield.

After landing along with the Emeralds, Sonic encounters a friendly creature who appears to suffer amnesia. Assuming he has caused it with his fall, Sonic decides to assist him in his quest to find out who he is, and the creature becomes a guide for Sonic; he then gives him the nickname "Chip". Sonic's quest begins, and with the help of some old friends, such as Amy and Tails, he attempts to solve the crisis by traveling the world's continents, finding Gaia Temples that will restore the Emeralds' power, in order to return the world, and himself, to normal.

After six out of the seven continents are returned to normal, Chip is able to regain his memory; he is in fact Dark Gaia's opposite, Light Gaia. Since the beginning of time, the two of them had been in a cycle where Dark Gaia would break the planet apart, and Light Gaia would put it back together. Chip was released along with Dark Gaia, but because both of them were released prematurely, he lost his memory, and Dark Gaia was broken apart. They are able to place the last Chaos Emerald in the shrine on the final continent at Eggman's new empire, "Eggmanland", but are interrupted by him; Sonic then defeats Eggman who is using a robot that utilizes Dark Gaia's power, the Egg Dragoon. During the battle, the three sink into the core of the Earth and encounter Dark Gaia. Eggman orders Dark Gaia to destroy Sonic, but it turns on him, knocking him away with one of its tentacles, and absorbs the power that turned Sonic into a Werehog, curing Sonic of lycanthropy.

Dark Gaia then attacks Sonic and Chip, but Chip protects Sonic and calls all of the Gaia temples together to form the Light Gaia Colossus and fight Dark Gaia. The Gaia Colossus seemingly destroys Dark Gaia, but Dark Gaia is not finished with them or the Earth yet, and consumes the entire world in darkness, becoming Perfect Dark Gaia in the process. Chip then gives the restored Chaos Emeralds to Sonic, allowing him to turn into Super Sonic and continue their fight, until he finally destroys it; Dark Gaia sinks back into the planet, but the battle takes its toll on Super Sonic. Chip saves Sonic by throwing him to the surface, before returning himself to the inside of the planet; he leaves behind his necklace and some parting words. Sonic places the necklace on his hand as a bracelet to remind him of their adventure together before speeding off with Tails, flying alongside him on the coastline in the Tornado plane.

Development
Sonic Team began development of the game in 2006, after having begun work on the core technology, the Hedgehog Engine, in 2005. The title Sonic Unleashed was trademarked by Sega on March 12, 2008. Screenshots of cutscenes, artwork, and a video were leaked ten days later, with the title confirmed by Sega on April 3, 2008 with a small selection of screenshots and an updated video. The game was developed internally by Sonic Team in Japan. It was originally intended to be the third installment of the Sonic Adventure series and subsequently, at an early development stage, had the working title Sonic World Adventure, complete with a work-in-progress logo. However, the development team began to introduce enough new innovations to separate it from the Sonic Adventure games, and so a new title, Sonic Unleashed, was decided. It was then later revealed that the game's name in Japan would in fact remain Sonic World Adventure for its release there.

Sonic Team decided early on in the development process to reduce the number of characters present in the game, as well as to make Sonic the only playable character; this decision was taken to get more quality out of fewer characters. While it felt that these ideas combined with traditional Sonic gameplay was a good beginning, it also had to consider how to introduce newer gamers unfamiliar with the Sonic franchise to the series, and so the concept of the Werehog was born, in addition to exploring its own mythology and ideas for the story. Director Yoshihisa Hashimoto felt from the outset that there would be both praise and criticism, but hoped that long-term Sonic fans would understand and empathise with the ideas and direction the team had taken. The game's human non-player characters were designed by Japanese artist team Gurihiru.

In terms of technology, Hashimoto remarked that the visual style was born out of desire to see a global illumination solution used for the game's lighting — that is, light reflecting from one object in the scene onto others. To this extent, development on the renderer for this process began, and the final solution allowed the developers to use distributed rendering over hundreds of computers to calculate lighting for each ten- to twenty-kilometer action stage in around two or three days. Characters, enemies and objects are then lit at run-time with Sonic Team's "Light Field" technology to blend them in with the surrounding pre-calculated lighting. Because the game was being developed for two levels of hardware capability depending on the target platform, two development "silos" were set up to work on two separate builds of the game: one for the Xbox 360 and PlayStation 3 version utilizing the Hedgehog Engine, and one for the Wii and PlayStation 2 version, which instead utilizes a modified version of an existing, internal Sega engine. Hashimoto, who had never directed a Sonic game before, incorporated new features such as a "Quick Step" mechanic allowing players to dodge obstacles with the L and R triggers. Hashimoto sought to combine the best qualities of 2D and 3D Sonic gameplay and address the criticisms directed at previous 3D entries in the franchise. Additional code to dynamically adjust the speed of the game for different situations was used to properly balance its fast pace with traditional platforming elements.

As well as the unique motion-based gameplay mechanics, the Wii version of the game also supports the GameCube controller, and also the option of using the Classic Controller. The daytime levels for the Wii were altered to accommodate the motion control-based boost mechanic, while night-time levels include a mostly behind-the-back view and different platforming styles and combat mechanics. Developer Dimps, who had past involvement in the Sonic franchise, was involved in the design of the daytime areas for these versions. In addition, overall, the Wii and PlayStation 2 versions have fewer daytime levels than the Xbox 360 and PlayStation 3 counterparts.

Initially, it was stated that Unleashed was to be intended solely as a single-player experience, and would not offer any multiplayer or online modes. This was cast into doubt when references to online modes were alluded to around E3 2008, but later interviews re-iterated that Unleashed would have no online modes at all. However, downloadable content, including additional levels, would remain a possibility after the game's release.

Sonic Unleashed was released for PlayStation 2, Wii and Xbox 360 on November 18, 2008, in North America, and on November 27 and November 28, 2008, in Australia and Europe, respectively. The PlayStation 3 version was released a month later on December 9 in North America, on December 18 in Australia, and on December 19 in Europe. In Japan the Wii version was released on December 18, 2008, with the Xbox 360 and PlayStation 3 versions releasing next year, on February 19, 2009.

A demo version was released on the Xbox Live Marketplace on December 8, 2008 and on the US and EU PlayStation Stores on December 18 and 24, 2008, respectively. The demo does not contain any of the Werehog stages. On March 12, 2009, Sega released Sonic Unleasheds first downloadable content for the Xbox 360 and PlayStation 3, consisting of four Chun-nan daytime stages and two night stages in addition to two new missions. Since then, more downloadable levels have been added: Spagonia, Holoska, Mazuri, Apotos, Shamar, Empire City and Adabat.

Speaking after the game's release, Sonic Team member and Sonic and the Black Knight producer and director Tetsu Katano remarked that although he did not feel the Werehog concept was a mistake, time and resources were a limiting factor in the game's production. He also remarked that the Werehog may reappear in future games, or possibly in a sequel to Sonic Unleashed, should one be made.

Game developer Gameloft announced in May 2009 that it had secured a licensing agreement with Sega Europe Ltd. to produce Java versions of Sega properties, and that its first game would be a version of Sonic Unleashed for mobile phone platforms. It was released in June 2009 in Europe, Middle East, Australia and New Zealand. The mobile version of Sonic Unleashed is strictly a side-scroller reminiscent of the original Genesis games, featuring new level designs and character abilities.

Music
The game's soundtrack, Planetary Pieces: Sonic World Adventure Original Soundtrack, was released as a three-disc set in Japan on January 28, 2009. The vocal theme track, "Endless Possibility" written by longtime Sonic game composer, Tomoya Ohtani, features Jaret Reddick of the American rock band Bowling for Soup. The ending theme music for the game is a slow tempo ballad, "Dear My Friend", and features singer Brent Cash.

Reception

Initial anticipation when the first media for Unleashed was revealed was high, as the demonstration videos hinted at a possible return of Sonic to his traditional platforming roots, especially because of the series' declining quality in recent years, and a number of poorly received games in the franchise that preceded it, such as the 2006 game, Sonic the Hedgehog.

Critical reception to Unleashed was mixed, with Metacritic aggregate scores of 60 and 54 out of 100 for the Xbox 360 and PlayStation 3 versions respectively, and 66 out of 100 for the Wii and PlayStation 2 versions. The added element of motion controls for the Werehog sections, as well as text-based hub worlds and better Werehog level design and camera system, were reasons cited for the higher review scores for the Wii and PlayStation 2 versions of the game, though a few review websites, such as 1UP, gave the Wii version a lower score than its Xbox 360 and PlayStation 3 counterparts. Nevertheless, the game was a commercial success and sold 2.45 million units combined making it Sega's third bestselling game during their last fiscal year period of 2008.

Positive elements of Sonic Unleashed remarked upon by reviews include the environments, such as the "postcard-perfect architecture", and the graphics, with stages looking "absolutely gorgeous" and being "very pretty and lovingly animated", with one reviewer comparing them to a playable Pixar film. Praise was given to the technical competence of Sega's new Hedgehog Engine as a whole on the Xbox 360 and PlayStation 3 versions, with "bright cartoonish graphics that fly by without a stutter"; however, some complaints were raised about frame rate reduction when large numbers of enemies appeared during the Werehog sections. Although the Wii and PlayStation 2 versions do not use the Hedgehog Engine, graphics for these platforms were still praised for their high quality, with the game being nominated for Best Graphics Technology for the Wii by IGN in its 2008 video game awards. The soundtrack to the game was also praised as being an improvement on more recent installments in the series; use of an orchestral score, rather than rock as in more recent games, was appreciated.

A generally negative reaction was given by critics to the Werehog concept and corresponding night-time sections, which contributed greatly to the lower than expected review scores. Some reviewers compared the Werehog sections to God of War. Complaints stemmed from the game's change of speed, from high-speed daytime sections to the slower, night-time sections; the "pace-breaking combat levels" were described as "plodding", as well as "lethargic" and "combat-heavy". Further to the change of pace, the new style of gameplay that accompanies the night-time levels was widely criticized, involving "frustrating" platform elements and combat described as not "terribly interesting" and "boring", with "awkward" action sequences overall. Some reviewers felt that the Werehog as a concept did not mix well with the daylight areas and traditional Sonic gameplay; GamePros review described them as "dreadfully out-of-place", while IGN stated that they have "nothing to do with Sonic whatsoever", feeling that the Werehog was "being slapped on" to the Sonic experience.

In stark contrast to the Werehog sections, many reviewers found the daytime levels to be enjoyable, especially the "exhilarating" sense of speed they provide; with "the most satisfying gameplay of any Sonic title in years", the game "perfectly [captures] the feel of classic Sonic". Many also enjoyed the mixture of, and transition between, 2D and 3D sections. Indeed, many reviewers remarked that they would have appreciated the game more had it consisted solely of, and expanded upon, the daytime levels. GameSpot's review for the Xbox 360 version, however, argued that the controls were "unresponsive" in the daytime levels, and that most of them were "horribly designed", instead describing the Wii version as a "vastly superior experience", with its daytime levels praised for better control and design.

Aside from the criticism of Werehog levels, further aspects of the game were criticised, contributing to the mixed review scores. The quests that players must undertake in hub-towns were described as "inane" and "tedious", where "figuring out what happens next involves aimlessly wandering through towns and speaking to citizens, only to discover that most of them don't know what we're looking for". The story and overall tone of the game, including the new character Chip, were criticised, some remarking that it was too juvenile, or comparable to that of a Saturday morning cartoon.

Legacy
Archie Comics published an adaptation of Sonic Unleashed featuring the opening cutscene and Sonic's transformation into the Werehog. A short CGI animated film was released to tie in with the game on November 17, 2008, Sonic: Night of the Werehog. The film was produced by Marza Animation Planet, who also animated the cutscenes for Unleashed and were later involved in Paramount's live-action adaptation of the series.

Sonic Unleasheds engine, the Hedgehog Engine, would later be refined for use with later games in the franchise, such as Sonic Generations (2011) and Sonic Forces (2017). The daytime gameplay style of Unleashed was re-used and expanded upon to become the defining gameplay of the franchise.

To celebrate the Sonic franchise's 20th anniversary, Sega released Sonic Generations, which re-made various stages and aspects from throughout the series. The console/PC versions of the game contain remakes of the "Rooftop Run" stage and the Egg Dragoon boss fight. The 2017 entry Sonic Forces also contains a re-imagined version of the Egg Dragoon boss.

Notes

References

External links

 (archived)

2008 video games
3D platform games
Mobile games
PlayStation 2 games
PlayStation 3 games
Sega video games
Sonic Team games
Sonic the Hedgehog video games
Sega beat 'em ups
Wii games
Xbox 360 games
Video games about shapeshifting
Werewolf video games
Video games using Havok
Lua (programming language)-scripted video games
Video games scored by Tomoya Ohtani
Video games scored by Fumie Kumatani
Video games scored by Takahito Eguchi
Video games set in amusement parks
Video games set in Africa
Video games set in the Arctic
Video games set in Asia
Video games set in China
Video games set in Greece
Video games set in Italy
Video games set in the Middle East
Video games set in Thailand
Video games set in New York City
Video games with alternative versions
Single-player video games
Gameloft games
Dimps games
Video games scored by Kenichi Tokoi
Video games scored by Hideaki Kobayashi
Video games developed in Japan